The Girl on the Train is a 2015 psychological thriller novel by British author Paula Hawkins that gives narratives from three different women about relationship troubles (caused by coercive/controlling men) and, for the main protagonist, alcoholism. The novel debuted in the number one spot on The New York Times Fiction Best Sellers of 2015 list (print and e-book) dated 1 February 2015, and remained in the top position for 13 consecutive weeks, until April 2015. In January 2016 it became the #1 best-seller again for two weeks. Many reviews referred to the book as "the next Gone Girl", referring to a popular 2012 psychological mystery, by author Gillian Flynn, with similar themes that used unreliable narrators.

By early March, less than two months after its release, the novel had sold over one million copies, and an additional half million by April. It occupied the #1 spot of the UK hardback book chart for 20 weeks, the longest any book has ever held the top spot. By early August, the book had sold more than three million copies in the U.S. alone, and, by October 2016, an estimated 20 million copies worldwide; by 2021, the book had sold an estimated 23 million copies worldwide. The audiobook edition, released by Books on Tape, was narrated by Clare Corbett, Louise Brealey and India Fisher. It won the 2016 Audie Award for "Audiobook of the Year".

The film rights were acquired before the book was published, in 2014, by DreamWorks Pictures for Marc Platt Productions. The American film adaptation, starring Emily Blunt and directed by Tate Taylor, had its world premiere on 20 September 2016 in London before it had its theatrical release in the United States on 7 October.

Plot
The story is a first-person narrative told from the point of view of three women: Rachel Watson, Anna Boyd/Watson, and Megan Hipwell.

Rachel Watson is a 33-year-old alcoholic, reeling from the end of her marriage to Tom, who left her for another woman. Rachel's drinking has caused her to lose her job; she frequently binges and has blackouts. While drunk, she often harasses Tom, though she has little or no memory of these acts once she sobers up. Tom is now married to Anna Boyd and has a daughter with her, Evie – a situation that fuels Rachel's self-destructive tendencies, as it was her inability to conceive a child that began her spiral into alcoholism. Rachel follows her old routine of taking the train to and from London every day, one at 8:04 in the morning and the other at 5:56 in the evening. Her train slowly passes her old house on Blenheim Road, where Tom, Anna, and Evie now live. She also begins watching from the train an attractive couple who live a few houses away from Tom. She idealises their life (christening them "Jason" and "Jess"), though she has no idea that their life is far from perfect. The wife of the couple, Megan Hipwell ("Jess"), has a troubled past. She finds her life boring, and escapes from her troubles by taking a series of lovers. Megan has sought help by seeing a therapist, Dr. Kamal Abdic. Eventually, she reveals to him a dark secret she has never confided to anyone before.

Anna is young, beautiful, in love with Tom, and happy as a stay-at-home mother to the young Evie. While at first she enjoyed the idea of showing off to Rachel that Tom picked her, she eventually becomes furious at Rachel's harassment of her family. One day, Rachel is stunned to see Megan kissing another man. The next day, after heavy drinking, Rachel awakens to find herself bloody and injured, with no memories of the night before. She learns that Megan is missing, and is questioned by the police after Anna reports having seen her drunkenly staggering around the night of Megan's disappearance. Rachel becomes interested in the case and tells the police she thinks Megan was having an affair. She then contacts Megan's husband, Scott ("Jason") and tells him as well, lying that she and Megan were friends. Rachel learns that the man she saw kissing Megan was Kamal.

Rachel contacts Kamal, lying about her identity to get close to him and learn more about him. She makes a therapy appointment with him to see if he can help her recall the events that happened during her blackout that night. While Kamal suspects nothing, Rachel begins to gain insight into her life by speaking with him, inadvertently benefiting from the therapy. Her connections to Scott and Kamal, though built on lies, make her feel more important. She ends up not drinking for several days at a time but always relapses. Meanwhile, she continues to call, visit, and harass Tom. Megan's body is found; she is revealed to have been pregnant, and her unborn child was fathered by neither Scott nor Kamal. As Scott discovers Rachel's lies and lashes out at her, her memories become clearer. Rachel remembers seeing Megan get into Tom's car. Anna discovers that Tom and Megan were having an affair.

Rachel begins trusting her own memories more, and realises that many of the crazy things Tom told her she did while drunk never really happened. He had been gaslighting her for years, which made her question her sanity. Armed with this sad realisation, and the knowledge that he must have been the one who killed Megan, Rachel warns Anna. When Anna confronts him, Tom confesses to murdering Megan after she threatened to reveal that he had made her pregnant. Anna is cowed, fearing for her daughter's safety. Tom tries to beat and intimidate Rachel into keeping silent, but she defies him and fights back. Knowing he is about to kill her, Rachel stabs Tom in the neck with a corkscrew; Anna helps Rachel make sure that he dies from the wound. When the police arrive, former adversaries Rachel and Anna support each other by co-ordinating their stories to explain their actions as self-defense. Finally free, Rachel decides to quit drinking and move on with her life.

Reception
The review aggregator website Book Marks reported that 29% of critics gave the book a "rave" review, whilst 43% and 14% of the critics expressed "positive" or "mixed" impressions, respectively. Another 14% of the critics "panned" the book, based on a sample of seven reviews.

The Girl on the Train received mostly positive reviews from critics and audiences alike. In 2015 it became the fastest-selling adult hardcover novel in history, and it spent over four months on the New York Times Bestseller List following its release. Kirkus Reviews praised the novel with a starred review, writing that "even the most astute readers will be in for a shock as Hawkins slowly unspools the facts, exposing the harsh realities of love and obsession's inescapable links to violence." Subsequently, the novel was honoured by Kirkus Reviews as one of the best books of 2015, in the fiction category. The book also won the 2015 Goodreads Choice Award in the category Mystery & Thriller.

In a less positive review for The New York Times, Jean Hanff Korelitz questioned the novel's narrative structure and criticised the protagonist for behaving "illogically, self-destructively, and narcissistically."

The Girl on the Train has been compared frequently to Gone Girl by Gillian Flynn, as both novels employ unreliable narrators and deal with suburban life. Paula Hawkins has waved these comparisons off, however, saying in an interview with The Hollywood Reporter: "Amy Dunne is a psychopath, an incredibly controlling and manipulative, smart, cunning woman. [Rachel is] just a mess who can't do anything right."

Translations
The foreign rights have been sold in 34 countries, and the book has been translated into many languages, including:

In addition, there are two translations in Iran, a country which under sanctions does not recognise other countries' copyright agreements: one by Nilufar Amnzadeh and another by Mahbubeh Musavi.

Film adaptations

American adaptation

The film rights for the novel were acquired in March 2014 by DreamWorks Pictures and Marc Platt Productions, with Jared Leboff (a producer at Marc Platt) set to produce. Tate Taylor, who directed The Help (2011), was announced as the director of this film in May 2015, with Erin Cressida Wilson as scriptwriter. In June 2015, British actress Emily Blunt was in talks to portray Rachel. Author Hawkins said in July 2015 that the film's setting would be moved from the UK to the US. The film began production in the New York City area in October 2015. The film was released on 7 October 2016. It remains mostly faithful to events in the book; the only distinct difference is that Rachel realises the truth about Tom's accusations of her behaviour except that she does it through a chance meeting with the wife of Tom's former manager (instead of her own efforts); the wife reveals that Tom was actually fired from his job because of his numerous affairs at the office, rather than Rachel's having a violent breakdown at a party. (In reality, Rachel simply drank too much and passed out in a guest room until Tom made her leave.)

Indian adaptation

On 24 April 2019 it was announced an Indian adaptation of the book was in the works, starring Parineeti Chopra. The film was directed by Ribhu Dasgupta and produced under the banner of Reliance Entertainment. Principal photography began in early August 2019 in London. Unlike the 2016 American adaptation, the Indian adaptation retained the book's original UK setting, but changed the majority of the character to Non-Resident Indians. The film's original release date of 8 May 2020 was delayed due to the COVID-19 pandemic. The film was eventually released on 26 February 2021 on Netflix.

Stage adaptation 
A stage adaptation of the novel by Rachel Wagstaff and Duncan Abel made its world premiere in The Courtyard Theatre at the West Yorkshire Playhouse from 12 May to 9 June 2018. It stars Jill Halfpenny as Rachel Watson and is directed by Joe Murphy.

In 2022 it is presented by the Court Theater in Christchurch, New Zealand.

References

2015 British novels
Novels set in London
Fiction with unreliable narrators
British novels adapted into films
British novels adapted into plays
Psychotherapy in fiction
Novels about missing people
British thriller novels
Nonlinear narrative novels
Novels about alcoholism
Novels set on trains
Riverhead Books books
Doubleday (publisher) books